Aquarium is a station on the River Line light rail system, located on Delaware Avenue in Camden, New Jersey.  It is named for the nearby Adventure Aquarium located in on the Camden Waterfront.

The station opened on March 15, 2004. Southbound service from the station is available to the line's terminus at Entertainment Center. Northbound service is available to the Walter Rand Transportation Center in Camden, with transfer to the PATCO Speedline Philadelphia, Pennsylvania. With intermediary stops the line continues to Trenton Transit Center served by New Jersey Transit, SEPTA trains, and Amtrak trains.

Transfers 
New Jersey Transit buses: 452, 453, and 457
RiverLink Ferry

References

External links

 Station from Google Maps Street View

River Line stations
Railway stations in the United States opened in 2004
2004 establishments in New Jersey
Transportation in Camden, New Jersey
Railway stations in Camden County, New Jersey